Troublesome Night 18 is a 2003 Hong Kong horror comedy film produced by Nam Yin and directed by Jameson Lam. It is the 18th of the 20 films in the Troublesome Night film series.

Plot
Kong Lik-son was born with the ability to see ghosts and spirits. One day, he sees a restless soul, Mrs Chung, who is looking for a human replacement. Kong provokes Chung because he spoils her plan when he saves Ying-ying, and she keeps haunting him. Kong goes to find Mrs Bud Lung to help him, and she tells him that he had disrupted the balance of Yin and Yang when he saved Ying-ying's life. Mrs Chung had drowned during her pregnancy and she needs to find a human body for her unborn son to possess and be reborn. Mrs Bud asks Bud Gay and Ying-ying to bring Mrs Chung to the lakeside and wait for transmigrants.

Cast
 Law Lan as Mrs Bud Lung
 Michael Tong as Kong Lik-son
 Simon Lui as Bud Pit
 Yum Kong-sau as Ying-ying
 Frankie Ng as Brother Chi-hung
 Anita Chan as Audrey
 Baat Leung-gam as Eight
 Tong Ka-fai as Bud Gay
 Ronnie Cheung as Bud Yan
 Kitty Chung as Cheung Kit-see
 Big Cheong as Chiu
 Jass Chan as Fai
 Wong Koon-chen as Chung

External links
 
 

2003 comedy horror films
2003 films
Hong Kong comedy horror films
2000s Cantonese-language films
Troublesome Night (film series)
2000s Hong Kong films